The Alaska Department of Transportation & Public Facilities (DOT&PF) is a department within the government of Alaska. Its headquarters are in Alaska's capital city, Juneau. The mission of Alaska DOT&PF is to "Keep Alaska Moving through service and infrastructure."

The Alaska Department of Transportation was established on July 1, 1977, by Alaska Highway Commissioner Walter Parker during the administration of Governor Jay Hammond. The Alaska Department of Transportation and Public Facilities merged the former departments of Highways and Public Works. 

Alaska DOT&PF designs, constructs, operates and maintains the state's transportation infrastructure systems, buildings, and other facilities used by Alaskans and visitors. These include more than 5,600 miles of paved and gravel highways; more than 300 aviation facilities, including 235 rural airports and 2 international airports (Fairbanks International Airport and Ted Stevens Anchorage International Airport); 839 public facilities; 21 harbors; and a ferry system covering 3,500 marine miles serving 33 coastal communities.

Background 
The Board of Road Commissioners for Alaska, more commonly known as the Alaska Road Commission or ARC, was created in 1905 as a board of the U.S. War Department. It was responsible for the construction and improvement of many important Alaska highways, such as the Richardson Highway, Steese Highway, Elliot Highway and Edgerton Highway, among others. Wilds P. Richardson was the first president of the ARC, from 1905 to 1917.

The commission was transferred to the Department of the Interior in 1932, and was absorbed by the Bureau of Public Roads, a division of the Commerce Department in 1956. Today, responsibility for road development and maintenance in Alaska lies with the Alaska Department of Transportation & Public Facilities.

Organizational structure 

The Alaska DOT&PF is administratively divided into three regions, Northern, Central, and Southcoast.

The Northern Region, headquartered in Fairbanks, is the largest, most geographically diverse, and maintains more centerline miles of highway, including the Alaska Highway, Richardson Highway, Taylor Highway, Denali Highway, and Dalton Highway and portions of the Parks Highway and the Glenn Highway.

The Central Region, headquartered in Anchorage, includes the state's most urban areas, as well as some of the most remote villages on the Kuskokwim Delta, the Alaska Peninsula, and the Aleutian Chain. Central Region maintains the Seward Highway and the Sterling Highway, as well as parts of the Parks Highway and Glenn Highway.

The Southcoast Region, headquartered in Juneau, serves the coastal communities of Alaska encompassing a population of 98,000. Currently, only three Southcoast communities are connected to the continental highway system – Skagway, Haines, and Hyder.

The Alaska Marine Highway System is headquartered in Ketchikan, Alaska. From there, AMHS management directs the operation and maintenance of our fleet of nine vessels, ranging in size from the 181 ft. MV Lituya to the 418 ft. MV Columbia.

References

External links
 Alaska Department of Transportation & Public Facilities

Transportation
State departments of transportation of the United States